Laura Lee Clark  (born October 28, 1964) is an American interior designer based in Dallas, Texas. She is also recognized for her interior design showroom, adjoining her design space in the famous Dallas Design District at 1515 Slocum Strret.

Personal

Laura Lee Clark was born in 1964 in Greenville, Texas and graduated from Texas Christian University with a
Bachelor of Science in Interior Design in 1987 and Clark has studied at the Parsons School of Design in Italy. She
is married to John Falconer since 2004 and the couple has one daughter. Laura Lee is a Delta Delta Delta sorority alumna,
and a member of the Dallas Museum of Art, an American Society of Interior Designers Professional Member, a Registered Interior Designer with the State of Texas and a member of the Dallas Museum of Art.

Interior design

References

External links
 Official website

1964 births
Living people
American interior designers
American women interior designers
Texas Christian University alumni
People from Greenville, Texas
Artists from Texas
21st-century American women